Ganga Jamuna Saraswati is  1988 Indian Hindi-language romantic action film directed by Manmohan Desai, financed by Harakh Chand Nahata, produced by S. Ramanathan and starring Amitabh Bachchan as Ganga, Meenakshi Sheshadri as Jamuna, and Jaya Prada as Saraswati. Supporting cast includes Mithun Chakraborty, Amrish Puri, Nirupa Roy and Aruna Irani.

The movie was released on 23 December 1988 to excellent collections which susbequently dropped following negative reviews it received. India Today in January 1989 reported that by the second week collections in the Mumbai area were ranging between 28-40% resulting in the film being declared a box office flop. It however performed financially well when in its reruns during the 90s.

Plot

Thakur Hansraj (Amrish Puri) is a greedy man who kills his brother-in-law (Trilok Kapoor), gets the signature of his sister Bharati Devi (Nirupa Roy) on the property papers under a false pretext and takes control of her property. Bharati Devi's son Ganga (Amitabh Bachchan) who has taken a pledge to avenge the wrong done to his family, becomes a truck driver.

One day Jamuna (Meenakshi Sheshadri) jumps into his truck to save herself from a goon. Ganga is forced to stop the truck due to a road block. When it starts raining, Ganga ends up going to a nearby lodge to take shelter, pretending he and Jamuna are a couple. The next day, when the goon returns to take Jamuna away forcibly, Ganga gets into a fight with him. Ganga is arrested for beating up the Thakur's son and jailed for two years. 

When he returns, the Thakur sends his aides to kill him. A blast takes place at the bridge and Jamuna falls into the river along with her child. Ganga saves his child but cannot find Jamuna. Jamuna, who loses her memory from the fall, ends up reaching the home of singer Shankar (Mithun Chakraborty) who recognizes her from a qawwali performance she had performed, and falls in love with her. Ganga takes help from Saraswati (Jaya Prada) to take care of his son, and she ends up falling in love with him. 

The remainder of the movie deals with how Ganga and Jamuna reunite, and the roles played by Saraswati and Shankar, and of course Ganga's mission to exact revenge on the Thakur uncle.

Cast

Amitabh Bachchan as Ganga
Meenakshi Sheshadri as Jamunaa
Jaya Prada as Saraswati
Mithun Chakraborty as Shankar Qawaal
Trilok Kapoor as Thakur Prasad (Ganga's dad)
Nirupa Roy as Bharati Devi (Ganga's mom)
Amrish Puri as Thakur Hansraj Singh
Mahesh Anand as Shakta (Hansraj's Son)
Bharat Bhushan as Pandit, (Shankar's father)
Chandrashekhar as Police Commissioner
Jack Gaud as Bheema
Aruna Irani as Jamuna's aunt (Cameo)
Goga Kapoor as Inspector Goga
Mukri as Manager of Honeymoon Lodge
Murad as Judge (uncredited)
Bhushan Tiwari as Jagga
Dev Kumar as Hansraj's Goon
Joginder as Ranga

Music 
The overall music director for the film was Anu Malik and the lyricist was Indeevar and Prayaag Raj, The song "Tere Dar Ko Chhod Chale" was originally sung by Maqbool Ahmed Sabri who was uncredited for the song, and was later re-recorded in the voice of Pankaj Udhas

References

External links
 

1988 films
1980s Hindi-language films
Indian drama films
Films scored by Anu Malik
Films directed by Manmohan Desai
1988 drama films
Hindi-language drama films